George W. Chapman (8 October 1920 – April 1998) is an English former professional footballer who scored 12 goals from 43 appearances in the Football League playing for Brighton & Hove Albion. Born in Linton, Derbyshire, he began his career with West Bromwich Albion, but played only matches in the wartime competitions for that club, never in the League. He was Brighton's top scorer in the 1946–47 season with 10 goals in all competitions. Chapman played as an inside left.

References

1920 births
1998 deaths
People from South Derbyshire District
Footballers from Derbyshire
English footballers
Association football inside forwards
West Bromwich Albion F.C. players
Brighton & Hove Albion F.C. players
Tonbridge Angels F.C. players
English Football League players